Idiata is a surname. Notable people with the surname include:

Anthony Idiata (born 1975), Nigerian high jumper
Samson Idiata (born 1988), Nigerian high jumper and long jumper

Surnames of Nigerian origin